Mixed Nuts is a 1994 American Christmas dark comedy film directed by Nora Ephron, based on the 1982 French comedy film Le Père Noël est une ordure. Co-written by Ephron and her sister Delia, the film features an ensemble cast which includes Steve Martin, Madeline Kahn, Rita Wilson, Anthony LaPaglia, Garry Shandling, Rob Reiner, Juliette Lewis, Adam Sandler, and, in his first film role, Liev Schreiber.

The film was released theatrically on December 21, 1994, and was both critically and commercially unsuccessful.

Plot
In a coastal California town on Christmas Eve, ex-con Felix is being chased down the road by his angry, pregnant wife, Gracie, dressed as Santa Claus. He accidentally runs into and damages a Christmas tree carried by two rollerbladers. When an argument breaks out among them, a stranger, Philip, unsuccessfully attempts to calm them down. They soon disperse, Philip picks up the tree and rides off on his bike.

Philip, head of the suicide-prevention hotline "Lifesavers", receives an eviction notice from his landlord, Stanley, after being unable to pay their rent for several months. The hotline is also staffed by the neurotic and fearful office manager, Mrs. Munchnik and the overly emotional, empathetic supervisor Catherine. Philip, not telling his coworkers of the eviction, tries to get his loan officer girlfriend, Susan, to grant him a small loan to save Lifesavers. Not only does she not grant the loan, but she breaks up with him for a psychiatrist.

Despite expecting Christmastime to bring multiple crises to solve, they have received few calls. One call is from a woman who fears the LA serial killer "the Seaside Strangler," and another from Chris, a trans woman feigning depression to get the Lifesavers' office address. Meanwhile, an elevator malfunction leaves Mrs. Munchnik trapped on her way to Christmas Eve dinner. Philip eventually manages to pull her to the top of the elevator when Gracie arrives and attempts to operate it. They fear they will be crushed by the ceiling of the elevator shaft, but eventually they all manage to return to the office.

Felix arrives, begging Gracie to listen to him, and she hits him in the head with a fruitcake, concussing him and cutting his forehead badly. Philip and Catherine take him to a veterinarian to be treated for the wound. As the doctor is distracted talking with Philip, Felix takes and overdoses on dog tranquilizers so is taken to a hospital.

Meanwhile, at the office, the doorbell rings. Gracie quickly throws the door open, accidentally striking Mrs. Munchnik and revealing Chris in the doorway. Gracie leaves Chris to care for the unconscious Mrs. Munchnik. When Philip returns, Chris convinces him to dance. Mrs. Munchnik awakens, witnesses their dancing and threatens to sue Philip for withholding information of the eviction and for inappropriate office behavior before leaving.

Soon, Gracie, Catherine, and downstairs neighbor Louie Capshaw, all return to the office with Chinese food. Meanwhile, Philip throws the fruitcake out of the office window and smashes the windshield of Mrs. Munchnik's car, recently fixed at the car club. Distraught, fellow neighbor Mr. Lobel approaches her with his three dogs. Comforting her, Munchnik realizes she has loved him for a long time. Together, they flee to the beach and have sex in the lifeguard's office.

An hour later, Felix arrives at the office brandishing a gun, having escaped from the hospital. Chris gets shot in the foot after attempting to disarm him. Gracie takes it, shooting wildly around the office to empty it of ammunition. Two shots go through the front door, killing Stanley (having been called by Catherine to fix the elevator earlier), who was standing behind it with a bag of his possessions. The sight of the dead Stanley puts Catherine in shock. Philip prepares a bath to calm her down, confesses his love to her, who reciprocates. They have sex in the bathroom.

Meanwhile, Chris becomes interested in Louie and they begin flirting. Louie reprises his earlier appearance and sings impromptu songs on his prized ukulele. Gracie and Felix disguise Stanley's body as a Christmas tree with burlap and super glue, and the group plans to leave it on the boardwalk.

As they all carry Stanley's body down the street, they encounter the vengeful rollerbladers carrying another Christmas tree. The group are charged in revenge, to destroy their "tree".

Felix tosses the tree and it crashes to the ground, revealing Stanley's body. When the police arrive, Philip indicates it's Felix's gun, who prepares to be arrested. Gracie pulls it out to prove her guilt. Felix grabs it, running to the roof of a building, and threatens to commit suicide. 

Philip's emotional speech about Christmas convinces Felix to climb down and a crowd of bystanders applauds. Catherine hands Stanley's bag to the detectives, who search it. They find fishing line and kelp, the Seaside Strangler's weapons of choice, revealing Stanley to be the serial killer.

For killing the criminal, Gracie receives a $250,000 reward. She gives the Lifesavers' some of the money to pay their debts, preventing their eviction, then promptly goes into labor. Giving birth at midnight on Christmas Day, the scene parodies the Nativity of Jesus. Philip then proposes to Catherine, and she accepts.

In the end credits, Felix is finally commissioned to paint murals and his career takes off from there. His first commission is of everything that has happened to them all.

Cast

 Steve Martin as Philip
 Madeline Kahn as Mrs. Blanche Munchnik
 Robert Klein as Mr. Lobel
 Anthony LaPaglia as Felix
 Juliette Lewis as Gracie
 Rob Reiner as Dr. Kinsky
 Adam Sandler as Louie Capshaw
 Liev Schreiber as Chris
 Garry Shandling as Stanley
 Rita Wilson as Catherine O'Shaughnessy
 Parker Posey and Jon Stewart as Rollerbladers
 Joely Fisher as Susan
 Christine Cavanaugh and Henry Brown as Police officers
 Brian Markinson as Policeman / Voice of obscene caller
 Steven Wright as Man at pay phone
 Caroline Aaron and Mary Gross as Hotline callers
 Victor Garber as Voice of irate neighbor
 Haley Joel Osment as Little boy
 Michael Badalucco as AAA driver
 Sidney Armus and Diane Sokolow as Chris's parents
 Kurt Lockwood as Rollerblading Snowman (uncredited)

Production
The film was initially titled The Night Before Christmas when it was in development at Walt Disney Pictures, however the film went into  turnaround and ended up at TriStar Pictures. While the film is set in Los Angeles, due to an impending International Alliance of Theatrical Stage Employees strike the filmmakers setup interior filming locations in New York City. A snowstorm impacted the travel of the cast and crew who became reliant on the New York City Subway to get to the set.

Soundtrack

 "Mixed Nuts" by Dr. John – 2:29
 "I'll Be Home for Christmas" by Fats Domino – 4:08
 "Santa Baby" by Eartha Kitt – 3:26
 "Jingle Bells" by Eastern Bloc – 2:25
 "Blue Christmas" by Leon Redbone – 2:24
 "What Are You Doing New Year's Eve?" by The O'Jays – 5:14
 "Mixed Notes" by George Fenton – 3:48
 "Grape Jelly" by Adam Sandler – 1:25
 "Christmas Melody" by George Fenton – 2:54
 "The Night Before Christmas" by Carly Simon – 3:39
 "Silent Night" by Baby Washington – 3:23
 "White Christmas" by The Drifters – 2:41

Release
The film opened on December 21, 1994, and made $2,307,850 in its first weekend, ranking number 12 in the domestic box office. By the end of its run, it had grossed a mere $6,821,850.

Critical reception
On review aggregator Rotten Tomatoes, the film holds an approval rating of 13% based on 31 reviews, with an average rating of 3.1/10. The website's critical consensus reads, "Mixed Nuts may provoke strong allergic reactions in all but the most undemanding filmgoers - and the most forgiving Steve Martin fans." On Metacritic, the film had a weighted average score of 14 out of 100 based on 16 critics, indicating "overwhelming dislike". Audiences surveyed by CinemaScore gave the film a grade "C+" on scale of A to F.

Janet Maslin's review in The New York Times mentioned a corpse depicted in the story and wrote that the film "is about as funny as that corpse and about as natural." Variety staff wrote, "Director/co-scripter Nora Ephron pitches the humor at a cacophonous level and displays the comedic equivalent of two left feet in evolving an absurdist, slapstick yarn. Truly alarming is watching some fine performers, including Kahn and LaPaglia, at their very worst." Roger Ebert of the Chicago Sun-Times wrote "The movie has a first-rate cast and crew; it's Nora Ephron's first directing job since the wonderful Sleepless in Seattle [...] Maybe there's too much talent. Every character shines with such dazzling intensity and such inexhaustible comic invention that the movie becomes tiresome, like too many clowns." Michael Dwyer in the Irish Times, reviewing it upon its European release, called Ephron's film "a truly pathetic effort", and "one of the worst films I have ever seen".

Year-end lists
 5th worst – Desson Howe, The Washington Post
 10th worst – Robert Denerstein, Rocky Mountain News
 Dishonorable mention – William Arnold, Seattle Post-Intelligencer
 Dishonorable mention – Dan Craft, The Pantagraph

See also
 List of Christmas films
 Box office bomb

References

External links
 
 
 
 
 
 

1994 films
1990s Christmas comedy films
1990s serial killer films
1990s pregnancy films
American Christmas comedy films
American LGBT-related films
Films directed by Nora Ephron
Films with screenplays by Nora Ephron
American remakes of French films
Films scored by George Fenton
Films about suicide
Films set in Los Angeles
Films shot in Los Angeles
Films shot in New York City
American pregnancy films
Films about trans women
TriStar Pictures films
1994 comedy films
1990s English-language films
1990s American films